"Puffy de Rumba" is the 8th single released by Japanese pop duo Puffy AmiYumi. It was released on December 12, 1998.  In the music video, Ami and Yumi sing and dance in a magical garden and meet Jimi Hendrix. Some of this song also played in the Hi Hi Puffy AmiYumi episode titled "Janice Jealous." Rumba de Puffy did a slow jam version from the album Rumba! UN! as of it was added in Do It Now! Singles chart but lost I've Been Working This Saturday.

Track listing
 Puffy de Rumba
 Peace
 Puffy de Rumba (Original Karaoke)
 Peace (Original Karaoke)

References

Puffy AmiYumi songs
1998 singles
1998 songs